Cherney is a Yiddish/Hebrew-language surname derived from Russian word Чёрный (chyorny/cherny) meaning "black". It may refer to:

Michael Cherney
Darryl Cherney
Derek Cherney
Lawrence Cherney
Brian Cherney

See also 
Cheney (surname)
Chesney

Hebrew-language surnames
Yiddish-language surnames